Sharjah International Airport is an international airport located  east-southeast of Sharjah, United Arab Emirates. It has one runway, and is the only airport in Sharjah capable of international flights as of 2022.

Overview
 

Sharjah International Airport is the third largest Middle East airfreight hub in cargo tonnage, according to official 2015 statistics from Airports Council InTernational. Ground services company, Sharjah Aviation Services, handled 586,195 tonnes in 2015 – a 16.1% increase year on year.

Sharjah International Airport is home base of the low-cost carrier Air Arabia. The headquarters of Air Arabia is in the Sharjah Freight Center, on the property of the airport in Sharjah, UAE. The center is an old cargo terminal.

The BAe party was headed by Sir Geoffrey Tuttle, which received a great welcome, the whole party were also given watches and a few received magnificent swords as well.

It replaced RAF Sharjah which was closer to the city and was opened in 1932. It was the first airport in UAE and the Cooperation Council for the Arab States of the Gulf, for use by Imperial Airways, and was subsequently used by the RAF until 14 December 1971. The reason for the move was development pressure from the city of Sharjah. The old terminal and tower building is now Al Mahatta Museum. The old airport's runway is now part of King Abdul Aziz Street in the city centre.

The airport was used by the United States Air Force 926th Tactical Fighter Group during Operation Desert Shield/Storm. Approximately 450 members of the unit were stationed at the airport, which flew A-10 Thunderbolt II ground attack aircraft during the conflict in late 1990 and early 1991.

Facilities

Financial services at the airport include banking, ATMs and exchange centres. Founded in 1985, Sharjah Airport Travel Agency is owned by the Sharjah Airport Authority, Government of Sharjah and has 14 branches in the UAE, including one on the first floor of the main terminal at Sharjah Airport. There are two prayer rooms available, one in the transit area of the Arrivals Terminal and the other in the ground floor of the Departures Terminal. In addition to this there are mosques in both the East and West Cargo Terminals 3 and 4.

Airlines and destinations

Passenger

The following airlines operate regular scheduled and charter flights to and from Sharjah:

Cargo

Statistics

Ground transport

Accidents and incidents
On 15 December 1997, a Tupolev Tu-154 from Tajikistan Airlines Flight 3183 crashed on approach to SHJ. Some 13 km from Sharjah the plane ran into terrain and 85 of the 86 occupants died. One of the seven crew members survived the disaster.
On 10 February 2004, Kish Air Flight 7170, operated by a Fokker 50 crashed on approach, killing 43 of its 46 occupants, which consisted of 3 crew and 40 passengers.
On 7 November 2004, an Air Atlanta Boeing 747 freighter was damaged beyond repair due to an aborted take-off with insufficient runway remaining. None of the four crew was injured. The take-off was aborted after a report of smoke from the control tower and hearing a loud bang in the cockpit.
On 21 October 2009, Azza Transport Flight 2241, operated by a Boeing 707–320, crashed on take-off. The flight was carrying cargo only and all six crew members were killed.

See also
 Mahatta Fort, the previous site of the airport

References

External links

 Official website
 
 
 

1977 establishments in the United Arab Emirates
Airports established in 1977
Airports in the United Arab Emirates
Geography of the Emirate of Sharjah
Transport in the Emirate of Sharjah
Buildings and structures in the Emirate of Sharjah